Stuart Anderson (born 22 April 1986 in Aberdeen) is a Scottish footballer who is player-manager of Formartine United in the Highland Football League.

Playing career

Southampton
Anderson started out his career a long way from his home town as he was signed by Southampton as a trainee. He played for their youth team and in 2003 was given a professional contract by the club. However, at the end of the season, he was no longer needed by the club and was allowed to leave without playing a first-team game.

Blackpool
His next move was to Blackpool in time for the 2004–05 season. As one of the younger players in the squad he rarely featured in the first team during his first season at the club and was mainly used as a back-up player. He played the majority of his game in the reserve side, but featured a few times in the 2004–05 season. The following season he found chances limited and eventually returned to Scotland when he went on loan to Ross County in February 2006 and remained there for the rest of the season. On his return to Blackpool, he got even less chance in the first team and was released at the end of the season.

Livingston
After a period out of the professional game, he was given a contract by Livingston in March 2007. This was only a short-term contract though to prove himself to the club. However, he failed to earn himself a contract for the following season in his month spell at Livingston.

Peterhead
After not being given a long-term contract by Livingston, Anderson was snapped up by Peterhead for the 2007–08 season. He quickly became a first team regular within the squad and established himself in the centre of midfield. He played regularly in the two seasons he remained at Peterhead, scoring 10 goals for the side. At the end of the 2008–09 season, he was offered a new contract by Peterhead. However, he decided to join Salisbury City on trial instead, turning down the contract offered to him.

Salisbury City
After impressing during pre-season, Anderson signed a one-year contract with Salisbury City in August 2009. He started the season in the centre of midfield and quickly established himself within the side, missing very few games for the first team, leading to him signing a contract extension until the end of the 2010–11 season in February 2010.

Return to Peterhead
He left Salisbury at the end of the 2009–10 season, citing personal reasons, and re-signed with Peterhead. However, in January 2011 he returned to Salisbury. "Stuart came to me a couple of weeks ago to say he'd been offered a job in Southampton and asked if he could leave the club," said Peterhead manager Neale Cooper. "I said at the time that we didn't have the numbers to allow that, but with a number of players returning we are now in position to allow him to leave."

Salisbury City
He returned to Salisbury City to play a part in their promotion to the Conference South, featuring in their play-off final win over Hednesford Town. He was rewarded with a new 1-year deal at the club. His second spell with the club saw Anderson establish himself as a key player for Salisbury. He also cashed in on regular appearances with a good goalscoring return, the highlight of this, converting a penalty in extra time away to Grimsby Town to win it for Salisbury and send them through to the third round of the FA Cup for the first time in their history.

Eastbourne Borough
On 23 February 2012 it was announced he had signed for Eastbourne Borough on a one-month loan deal, reuniting him with former Salisbury boss Tommy Widdrington.

Raith Rovers
On 12 July 2012 Anderson signed a contract with Raith Rovers becoming Grant Murray's first signing as manager.

In May 2013 he was released.

Brechin City
In June 2013 Anderson signed for Brechin City.

Formartine United
In January 2014, after being released by Brechin City, Anderson signed for Highland Football League club Formartine United.

Managerial Career
In March 2022, Anderson was appointed player-manager of Formartine United.

Honours
Ross County
Scottish Challenge Cup: 2006–07

References

External links
 

1986 births
Living people
Scottish footballers
Association football midfielders
Southampton F.C. players
Blackpool F.C. players
Ross County F.C. players
Livingston F.C. players
Peterhead F.C. players
Salisbury City F.C. players
Eastbourne Borough F.C. players
Raith Rovers F.C. players
Brechin City F.C. players
English Football League players
National League (English football) players
Scottish Football League players
Southern Football League players
Scottish Professional Football League players
Formartine United F.C. players
Highland Football League players
Formartine United F.C. managers
Scottish football managers
Footballers from Aberdeen
Highland Football League managers